Oliveriana is a genus of flowering plants from the orchid family, Orchidaceae. It contains 6 known species, all native to South America.

Oliveriana brevilabia (C.Schweinf.) Dressler & N.H.Williams - Peru, Ecuador
Oliveriana ecuadorensis Dodson - Ecuador, Venezuela
Oliveriana egregia Rchb.f. - Colombia, Guyana
Oliveriana lehmannii Garay - Colombia
Oliveriana ortizii A.Fernández - Colombia
Oliveriana simulans Dodson & R.Vásquez - Bolivia

See also 
 List of Orchidaceae genera

References 

 Berg Pana, H. 2005. Handbuch der Orchideen-Namen. Dictionary of Orchid Names. Dizionario dei nomi delle orchidee. Ulmer, Stuttgart

External links 

Orchids of South America
Oncidiinae genera
Oncidiinae